Styczynski or Styczyński is a Polish masculine surname, its feminine counterpart is Styczynska or Styczyńska. It may refer to:

Gary Styczynski (born 1965), Polish American poker player 
Karolina Styczyńska (born 1991), Polish shogi player

Polish-language surnames